Corey Davis may refer to:
Corey Davis (offensive lineman) (born 1985), American football offensive lineman
Corey Davis (wide receiver) (born 1995), American football wide receiver
Corey Davis Jr. (born 1997), American basketball player
Corey Shoblom Davis (born 1979), American entrepreneur and philanthropist